Leif Audun Sande (born 18 September 1953) is a Norwegian trade unionist and politician for the Socialist Left and Labour parties.

He hails from Lindås. He served as a deputy representative to the Parliament of Norway from Hordaland during the terms 1985–1989, 1989–1993 and 1993–1997. He was the vice president of the Norwegian Oil and Petrochemical Union from 1985 and president from 2000. In 2006 it merged to form Industri Energi, and Sande was president here until 2017.

For his new party, the Labour Party, Sande served as a deputy representative to the Parliament of Norway from Hordaland during the term 2017–2021. In total he has met during 309 days of parliamentary session.

References

1953 births
Living people
People from Lindås
Norwegian trade unionists
Deputy members of the Storting
Socialist Left Party (Norway) politicians
Labour Party (Norway) politicians
Hordaland politicians